Riccardo Tolentino was an Italian actor and film director of the silent era. He directed the 1917 Pushkin adaptation Wanda Warenine. In 1918, the same year of J. Searle Dawley's Uncle Tom's Cabin, he directed the Italian version La capanna dello zio Tom, with Paola Pezzaglia.

Selected filmography

Director
 Wanda Warenine (1917)
 La capanna dello zio Tom (1918)
 His Brother's Destiny (1919)

Actor
 Othello the Moor (1914)
 The Life of Giuseppe Verdi (1938)

References

Bibliography
 Goble, Alan. The Complete Index to Literary Sources in Film. Walter de Gruyter, 1999.

External links

Year of birth unknown
Year of death unknown
Italian male film actors
20th-century Italian male actors
Italian film directors